THE LAST ～colors～ and THE LAST ～infinity～ are two studio albums released by PANIC☆ch and the latter by its alter ego パニックちゃんねる  on March 18, 2009.

THE LAST ～colors～ Track listing
 829サービス
 fairy
 まじかるドリィマ～
 君と～「　」～
 片思ひ
 Peace
 together
 デートゥ。（New Rec Ver）
 Energy
 Catch～walk up to the continue～
 SPARKING
 one's life
 雑草
 ピンク・チェリー
 つぼみ
 829パートナー

THE LAST ～infinity～ Track listing
 ナイフ
 餌
 love less
 孤独妄想
 Rouge
 雫
 ラブレター（New Rec Ver）
 いやがらせ
 Unfiction
 セ・ツ・ナ
 覚醒バニラ（New Rec Ver）
 過去忘レ…。
 EMERALD
 無情麻薬
 Clear（New Rec Ver）
 Jewel

Personnel
 MEGURU – vocals
 Kana – guitar
 Mayo - guitar
 kiri – bass
 KYO~YA – drums

References

2009 albums
Panic Channel albums